Thomas Richard Sterck (June 20, 1900 – September 1970) was an American football player. 

Sterck was born in 1900 and attended Peabody High School in Pittsburgh. He was a star athlete at Peabody, participating in football and track. He set the school record in the discus. 

At age 18, and with World War I underway, Sterck joined the students' army and was assigned to Washington & Jefferson College. At Washington & Jefferson, he played at the center position, and was also tried as a guard, on the 1918 Washington & Jefferson Red and Black football team. At the end of the 1918 season, he was selected by Tiny Maxwell as a first-team center on his 1918 College Football All-America Team.

Sterck missed the 1919 football season with a broken leg. He returned to the football team in 1920 and also played on the Washington & Jefferson basketball team. 

Sterck later worked in the advertising business.

References

1900 births
1970 deaths
Washington & Jefferson Presidents football players
American football centers
Players of American football from Pittsburgh